William Toan (June 1, 1832March 28, 1901) was an American politician.

Early life
Toan was born on June 1, 1832, in Vernon, New York. Around 1837, Toan moved to Michigan.

Career
Toan was a farmer. In 1880, Toan was elected as sheriff of Ionia County, Michigan. He served two terms in this position from January 1, 1881, to 1885. Toan served as a deputy United States Marshal.

On November 6, 1888, Toan was elected to the Michigan Senate, where he represented the 19th district from January 1, 1889, to January 1, 1893. In the state senate, Toan bill proposed a bill to regulate the practice of dentistry, by requiring dental students seeking to practice in the state to graduate from a dental college that is in equal standing to that of the University of Michigan School of Dentistry. The bill passed the state senate on March 6, 1891. The bill passed the state house on May 8, 1891. The bill became law.

Personal life
During his time in the legislature, Toan lived in Portland, Michigan. By the time Toan was in the legislature, he was a widower.

Death
Toan died on March 28, 1901.

References

1832 births
1901 deaths
Farmers from Michigan
Michigan sheriffs
Republican Party Michigan state senators
People from Portland, Michigan
People from Vernon, New York
19th-century American politicians